Cycnogeton is a genus of plants in the family Juncaginaceae described as a genus in 1838.  It is native to Australia and New Guinea.

Species
The genus consists of the following species:

 Cycnogeton alcockiae (Aston) Mering & Kadereit - SA TAS VIC 
 Cycnogeton dubium (R.Br.) Mering & Kadereit -  NG NSW QLD NT VIC WA
 Cycnogeton huegelii Endl. - WA
 Cycnogeton lineare (Endl.) Sond. - WA
 Cycnogeton microtuberosum (Aston) Mering & Kadereit - NSW QLD VIC 
 Cycnogeton multifructum (Aston) Mering & Kadereit - NSW QLD VIC SA NT
 Cycnogeton procerum (R.Br.) Buchenau - NSW QLD VIC SA TAS
 Cycnogeton rheophilum (Aston) Mering & Kadereit - NSW QLD VIC  TAS

References

Juncaginaceae
Alismatales genera